David N. Thomas (born 1945) is a British writer.

Born in 1945, Thomas was brought up in south Wales, and studied at a number of English universities. He worked in London as a community worker, and then as a lecturer at the National Institute for Social Work and Chief Executive at the Community Development Foundation. He was also a founder member of the European Community Development Network,  and a Council of Europe Fellow.  He has published widely on community work, including Skills in Neighbourhood Work, with Paul Henderson.

Thomas retired back to Wales in the early 1990s, and since then has written about the life and death of Dylan Thomas. His first book on Thomas was published in 2000, A Farm, Two Mansions and a Bungalow. The film rights were sold to make The Edge of Love.

Selected Works on Dylan Thomas 

Dylan Thomas: A Farm, Two Mansions and a Bungalow, Seren, 2000

The Dylan Thomas Murders, Seren, 2002

Dylan Thomas Trail, Y Lolfa, 2002

Dylan Remembered 1914–1934, vol 1, Seren, 2003

Dylan Remembered 1935–1953, vol 2, Seren, 2004

Fatal Neglect: Who Killed Dylan Thomas?, Seren, 2008

The Death of Dylan Thomas, in the Western Mail, November 1, 2008

Dylan Thomas and The Edge of Love, in Cambria, February 2013

A True Childhood: Dylan's Peninsularity, in Dylan Thomas: A Centenary Celebration,  ed. by Hannah Ellis, Bloomsbury, 2014

References

External links 

 https://www.theguardian.com/uk/2004/nov/27/books.booksnews
 https://www.bbc.co.uk/arts/0/24748894
 http://downloads.bbc.co.uk/wales/archive/bbc-mid-wales-books-david-thomas-interview.pdf
 https://www.irishexaminer.com/viewpoints/books/gilding-the-legend-285124.html

1945 births
Living people